Gustavo Kuerten and Fernando Meligeni were the defending champions, but Meligeni did not compete this year. Kuerten teamed up with Jaime Oncins and lost in quarterfinals to tournament runners-up Aleksandar Kitinov and Eric Taino.

Donald Johnson and Cyril Suk won the title by defeating Aleksandar Kitinov and Eric Taino 7–5, 7–6(7–4) in the final.

Seeds

Draw

Draw

References

External links
 Official results archive (ATP)
 Official results archive (ITF)

Rado Swiss Open Gstaad - Doubles
1999 Doubles